The Spinning Wheel Restaurant, is a historic commercial building in Carmel-by-the-Sea, California. It was built in 1952, by Monterey Peninsula Builders and designed by architect Edwin Lewis Snyder as a restaurant. It is an example of a Monterey Colonial architecture style building. The structure qualifies as an important building in the city's downtown historic district property survey and was recorded with the California Register of Historical Resources on June 5, 2006.

History

The Spinning Wheel Restaurant was established by Joseph and Clara Motta, in December 1952 as a Steakhouse restaurant, located on Monte Verde Street between Ocean Avenue and 7th Avenue in Carmel-by-the-Sea, California. It is a two-story wood-frame and concrete block building with the exterior walls made of concrete blocks covered with a cement stucco finish. The second floor is wood-framed with cement stucco and has a full-width open balcony supported by steel joists cased in wood. The roof has an intersecting hip and gable roof with exposed rafters. There is a brick chimney on the south side. The first floor has a large, angled bay with a multi paned window, topped with a copper roof. The entry door is a wood-paneled dutch door.

The ground level was a restaurant for 30 years and the owners lived on the second floor, which had an ocean view. After the restaurant closed in 1996, the building became a commercial office space. The structure is adjacent to the Carmel City Hall.

Joseph Motta (1902-1985) died on February 18, 1985, at the age of 82. He was the owner and founder of the Spinning Wheel and the Clam Box restaurants in Camel. Three restaurants in the area wanted to transfer the water credits from the closed Spinning Wheel Restaurant. Motta's son, Ronald "Ron" Motta, transferred the water rights to the City on March 16, 2001.

The building qualified for inclusion in the city's Downtown Historic District Property Survey, and was registered with the California Register of Historical Resources on June 5, 2006. The property is significant under the California Register criterion 3, as the only commercial design by architect Edwin Lewis Snyder

See also
Monterey Peninsula

References

External links

 Downtown Conservation District Historic Property Survey

1952 establishments in California
Carmel-by-the-Sea, California
Buildings and structures in Monterey County, California